The Thirty Tyrants (hoi triákonta týrannoi) were a pro-Spartan oligarchy installed in Athens after its defeat in the Peloponnesian War in 404 BC. Upon Lysander's request, the Thirty were elected as a tyrannical government, not just as a legislative committee. Although they maintained power for only a brief eight months, their reign resulted in the killing of 5% of the Athenian population, the confiscation of citizens' property and the exile of other democratic supporters. They became known as the "Thirty Tyrants" because of their cruel and oppressive tactics. The two leading members were Critias and Theramenes.

The rule of the Thirty
With Spartan support, the Thirty established an interim  government in Athens. The Thirty were concerned with the revision, if not erasure, of democratic laws inscribed on the wall next to the Stoa Basileios. Consequently, the Thirty reduced the rights of Athenian citizens in order to institute an oligarchical regime. The Thirty appointed a council of 500 to serve the judicial functions formerly belonging to all the citizens. However, not all Athenian men had their rights removed. In fact, the Thirty chose 3,000 Athenian men "to share in the government". These hand-selected individuals had the right to carry weapons, to have a jury trial, and to reside within city limits. The list of the selected 3,000 was constantly revised. Although little is known about these 3,000 men ‒ for a complete record was never documented ‒ it is hypothesised that the Thirty appointed these select few as the only men the Thirty could find who were devotedly loyal to their regime.

Led by Critias, the Thirty Tyrants presided over a reign of terror in which they executed, murdered, and exiled hundreds of Athenians, seizing their possessions afterward. Both Isocrates and Aristotle (the latter in the Athenian Constitution) have reported that the Thirty executed 1,500 people without trial. Critias, a former pupil of Socrates, has been described as "the first Robespierre" because of his cruelty and inhumanity; he evidently aimed to end democracy, regardless of the human cost. The Thirty removed criminals as well as many ordinary citizens whom they considered "unfriendly" to the new regime for expressing support for the democracy. One of their targets was one of their own, Theramenes, whom Xenophon depicts as revolted by Critias' excessive violence and injustice and trying to oppose him. Critias accused Theramenes of conspiracy and treason, and then forced him to drink hemlock.  Many wealthy citizens were executed simply so the oligarchs could confiscate their assets, which were then distributed among the Thirty and their supporters. They also hired 300 "lash-bearers" or whip-bearing men to intimidate Athenian citizens.

The Thirty's regime did not meet with much overt opposition, although many Athenians disliked the new form of government. Those who did not approve of the new laws could either fight ‒ risking exile or execution ‒ or accept the Thirty's rule. Some supporters of democracy chose to fight and were exiled, among them Thrasybulus, a trierarch in the Athenian navy and noted supporter of democratic government. The uprising that overthrew the Thirty in 403 BCE was orchestrated by a group of exiles led by Thrasybulus. Critias was killed in the fighting at the doors of Athens.

Aftermath 
The Thirty Tyrants' brief reign was marred by violence and corruption. Historians have argued that the violence and brutality the Thirty carried out in Athens was necessary to transition Athens from a democracy to an oligarchy. However, the more violent the Thirty's regime became, the more opposition they faced.

The increased level of opposition ultimately led to the overthrow of the Thirty's regime by Thrasybulus' rebel forces. After the revolution, Athens needed to decide the best way to govern the liberated city-state and to reconcile the atrocities committed by the Thirty. It was decided to give amnesty to all of the members of the selected 3,000, except for the Thirty themselves, the Eleven (a group of prison magistrates appointed by lot who reported directly to the Thirty), and the ten who ruled in Piraeus. After the revolution that overthrew the Thirty Tyrants, Athens and its citizens struggled to reconcile and rebuild.

Mention of the Thirty 
Plato, in the opening portion of his Seventh Letter, recounts the rule of the Thirty Tyrants during his youth. He explains that following the revolution, fifty-one men became rulers of a new government, with a specific group of thirty in charge of the public affairs of Athens. Ten of the fifty-one were to rule the city, and eleven were sent to rule Piraeus. Plato corroborates the general consensus found in other sources: the rule of the Thirty was "reviled as it was by many". The rule of the Thirty made the former democracy resemble a golden age in comparison. Plato also includes an account of the interaction between Socrates and the Thirty.

In the Republic, Plato mentions Lysias, one of the men from Athens who escaped the Thirty's reign of terror. Lysias' brother Polemarchus "fell victim to the Thirty Tyrants".

Socrates and the Thirty
Due to their desire to remain in complete control over Athens, the Thirty sought to exile or kill anyone who outwardly opposed their regime. Socrates remained in the city through this period, which caused the public to associate him with the Thirty and may have contributed to his eventual death sentence, especially since Critias had been his student.

In Plato's Apology, Socrates recounts an incident in which the Thirty once ordered him (and four other men) to bring before them Leon of Salamis, a man known for his justice and upright character, for execution. While the other four men obeyed, Socrates refused, not wanting to partake in the guilt of the executioners. However, he did not attempt to warn or save Leon of Salamis. By disobeying, Socrates may have been placing his own life in jeopardy, and he claimed it was only the disbanding of the oligarchy soon afterward that saved his life:

When the oligarchy came into power, the Thirty Commissioners in their turn summoned me and four others to the Round Chamber and instructed us to go and fetch Leon of Salamis from his home for execution. This was of course only one of many instances in which they issued such instructions, their object being to implicate as many people as possible in their crimes. On this occasion, however, I again made it clear, not by my words but by my actions, that the attention I paid to death was zero (if that is not too unrefined a claim); but that I gave all my attention to avoiding doing anything unjust or unholy. Powerful as it was, that government did not terrify me into doing a wrong action. When we came out of the rotunda, the other four went to Salamis and arrested Leon, but I simply went home.

Later on in his Seventh Letter, Plato describes the interaction between the Thirty and Socrates from his own point of view:

They tried to send a friend of mine, the aged Socrates, whom I should scarcely scruple to describe as the most upright man of that day, with some other persons to carry off one of the citizens by force to execution, in order that, whether he wished it, or not, he might share the guilt of their conduct; but he would not obey them, risking all consequences in preference to becoming a partner in their iniquitous deeds.

The Italian historian Luciano Canfora has inferred that another of Socrates' students, Xenophon, might have played an important part in the rule of the Thirty, as one of the two commanders of the cavalry, which were the Thirty's militia. Indeed, in his book Hipparchos (Commander of the cavalry), Xenophon mentions just one of the commanders (there were always two), only to revile him, while never mentioning the other.

In his Memorabilia (Bk 1, Ch 2), Xenophon reports a contentious confrontation between Socrates and the Thirty, Critias included. Socrates is summoned before the group and ordered not to instruct or speak to anyone, whereupon Socrates mocks the order by asking sarcastically whether he will be allowed to ask to buy food in the marketplace. Xenophon uses the episode to illustrate both Socrates' own critique of the slaughtering of Athenian citizens by the Thirty, as well as make the case that the relationship between Critias and Socrates had significantly deteriorated by the time Critias obtained power.

List of the Thirty
The names of the Thirty are listed by Xenophon:

Aeschines of Athens, of the Kekropis tribe (not the famous orator)
Anaetius
Aresias
Aristoteles (also a member of the Four Hundred and mentioned in Plato's Parmenides)
Chaereleos
Charicles, son of Apollodorus
Chremo
Cleomedes, son of Lycomedes
Critias
Diocles
Dracontide
Erasistratus of Acharnae
Eratosthenes (not the well-known scholar)
Eucleides
Eumathes
Hiero
Hippolochus
Hippomachus
Melobius
Mnesilochus
Mnesitheides
Onomacles
Peison
Phaedrias
Pheido
Polychares
Sophocles (an Athenian orator, not the playwright)
Theogenes
Theognis
Theramenes, son of Hagnon, of the tribe Pandionis, in the deme of Steiria

References

Bibliography
Bultrighini, U. Maledetta democrazia: Studi su Crizia (Alessandria, 1999).
Krentz, Peter. The Thirty at Athens. Ithaca, N.Y.: Cornell University Press, 1982. Print. (hardcover )
Linder, Doug. "The Trial of Socrates: An Account". N.p., 2002. Web. 1 May 2014.
Németh, G. Kritias und die Dreißig Tyrannen: Untersuchungen zur Politik und Prosopographie der Führungselite in Athen 404/403 v.Chr. (Stuttgart, 2006).
Plato, and Hugh Tredennick. "Apology". The Last Days of Socrates. Harmondsworth: Penguin, 1969. 
Plato. Plato in Twelve Volumes, Vol. 7 translated by R.G. Bury. Cambridge, MA: Harvard University Press; London, William Heinemann Ltd. 1966.
Rhodes, P. A History of the Classical Greek World: 478-323 BC (Blackwell, 2006).
Usher, S. "Xenophon, Critias and Theramenes" in: JHS 88 (1968) 128-135.
Waterfield, Robin. Why Socrates Died: Dispelling the Myths. W. W. Norton & Company, 2009.
Wolpert, Andrew. Remembering Defeat: Civil War and Civic Memory in Ancient Athens. Baltimore: Johns Hopkins University Press, 2002 (hardcover )

External links
The Thirty Tyrants in World History Encyclopedia

 
Thirty Tyrants
History-related lists
404 BC
403 BC
5th-century BC disestablishments
1st-millennium BC disestablishments in Greece
5th-century BC establishments in Greece